The Swinging Cheerleaders is a 1974 comedy-drama film written and directed by exploitation film auteur Jack Hill (who was credited for writing the film as Jane Witherspoon).

The film was also released under the titles Locker Room Girls and H.O.T.S. II. It is the sequel of sorts to the 1973 film The Cheerleaders, directed by Paul Glickler; and was itself followed by Revenge of the Cheerleaders (1976), directed by Richard Lerner; and The Great American Girl Robbery (1979) (aka Cheerleaders Wild Weekend), directed by Jeff Werner.

Plot
In order to write an article for the Mesa University college newspaper on how cheerleading demeans women, Kate (Jo Johnston) infiltrates the cheerleading squad. The other cheerleaders deal with their own problems: Mary Ann (Colleen Camp) struggles to get her promiscuous football player boyfriend, Buck (Ron Hajek), to propose to her; Lisa (Rosanne Katon) is having an affair with statistics teacher Professor Thorpe (Jason Sommers); and Andrea (Rainbeaux Smith) debates whether or not to stay a virgin. Meanwhile, Kate uncovers unscrupulous dealings: the football coach (Jack Denton) and college dean (George D. Wallace) are in cahoots in rigging games to favor betting spreads that Professor Thorpe, who is also the bookie, arranges. Later, Prof. Thorpe turns against the coach and dean as they turn against their star quarterback, who they want to convince to throw the game for a big payoff. When confronted, the quarterback refuses on principle and is arrested by university police, who plant a marijuana joint on him as they carry out the dean's ultimatum. The movie endorses defiance of authority, and questions the ideals of love and virginity.

Cast

Jo Johnston - Kate
Rainbeaux Smith - Andrea
Colleen Camp - Mary Ann
Rosanne Katon - Lisa
Ron Hajek - Buck
Ric Carrott - Ross
Jason Sommers - Prof Thorpe
Ian Sander - Ron
George D. Wallace - Mr. Putnam
 Jack Denton - Coach Turner
John Quade - Belski
Robert Lee Minor - Ryan
Mae Mercer - Jessica Thorpe
Dion Lane - Janie Hamilton
Hank Rolike - Bartender
Fred Scheiwiller - Jerry
Jodi Carlson - Other cheerleader
Gary Schneider - Jock at party
Sandy Dempsey - Girl at Tryouts
Candy All - Girl at Tryouts

Production
The Swinging Cheerleaders was shot in Pacific Palisades, Los Angeles, California. According to co-writer/director Jack Hill, the film had a 12-day shoot.  They started work on the script at the end of January 1974 and the movie was in theatres by May. The original title of the script was Stand Up and Holler, because, as Jack Hill later put it, "Actresses had a way of not wanting to be in a movie called The Swinging Cheerleaders."

Reception
The Swinging Cheerleaders had a 30-theater opening on September 4, 1974 in the San Francisco exchange territory and grossed $101,855 in its first week. The film also had early success at drive-in theaters in cities such as Salt Lake City, Denver, Phoenix, Auburn, Washington, and Portland, Oregon. It opened in 61 theaters in the New England area during the second week of September with 40 of those theaters reporting an estimated $130,000 in grosses.

In popular culture 
Randall Dale Adams and David Harris saw The Swinging Cheerleaders at a Dallas drive-in theater on November 28, 1976; it was the second of a double feature preceded by The Student Body (1976, directed by Gus Trikonis). Both men mentioned their attendance at the drive-in as part of their alibis while being investigated for the murder of Dallas Police Department Officer Robert W. Wood. In the Errol Morris documentary The Thin Blue Line, Adams claimed that he did not feel comfortable with the film's content and so he and Harris left before it was finished. A few scenes from The Swinging Cheerleaders are shown in The Thin Blue Line.

Quentin Tarantino selected The Swinging Cheerleaders for the First Quentin Tarantino Film Fest in Austin, Texas, in 1996.

References

External links
 
 
 
 
Fcourt."The Underground Cheerleader For The Underground Press." The Swinging Cheerleaders. November 2000. Film Court.

1974 films
1974 comedy-drama films
American comedy-drama films
American high school films
Cheerleading films
1970s English-language films
1970s exploitation films
Films directed by Jack Hill
1970s American films